Edoardo Zardini (born 19 November 1976) is an Italian former alpine skier.

Career
During his career he has achieved 4 results among the top 10 (1 podium) in the World Cup. He competed in the 2002 Winter Olympics.

World Cup results
Top 3

References

External links
 
 

1976 births
Living people
Italian male alpine skiers
Olympic alpine skiers of Italy
Alpine skiers at the 2002 Winter Olympics